Nosratabad (also Romanized as Noşratābād; also known as Noratābād) is a village in Roqicheh Rural District, Kadkan District, Torbat-e Heydarieh County, Razavi Khorasan Province, Iran. At the 2006 census, its population was 538, in 118 families.

References 

Populated places in Torbat-e Heydarieh County